Labuan, officially the Federal Territory of Labuan, is a Federal Territory of Malaysia. Its territory includes  and six smaller islands, off the coast of the state of Sabah in East Malaysia. Labuan's capital is Victoria and is best known as an offshore financial centre offering international financial and business services via Labuan IBFC since 1990 as well as being an offshore support hub for deepwater oil and gas activities in the region. It is also a tourist destination for people travelling through Sabah, nearby Bruneians and scuba divers. The name Labuan derives from the Malay word labuhan which means harbour.

History

For three centuries from the 15th century, the north and west coast of Borneo including the island of Labuan was part of the Sultanate of Brunei. In 1775, Labuan was temporarily occupied by the British East India Company after the failure of the company's station at Balambangan Island. The Sultan of Brunei, Omar Ali Saifuddin I tried to secure the British East India Company’s support against the Sulu raiders by offering Labuan as an alternative to Balambangan but, instead the company made a second but failed attempt to set up a station on Balambangan. The Sultan's subsequent reoffering of Labuan to the company did not result in the establishment of a permanent British settlement on the island either.

British policy changed in the 18th century, when Labuan started to attract British interest again. James Brooke acquired the island for Britain through the Treaty of Labuan with the Sultan of Brunei, Omar Ali Saifuddin II on 18 December 1846. A British naval officer, Rodney Mundy, visited Brunei with his ship HMS Iris to keep the Sultan in line until the British Government made a final decision to take the island and he took Pengiran Mumin to witness the island's accession to the British Crown on 24 December 1846. Some sources state that during the signing of the treaty, the Sultan had been threatened by a British navy warship ready to fire on the Sultan's palace if he refused to sign the treaty while another source says the island was ceded to Britain as a reward for assistance in combating pirates.

The main reason why the British acquired the island was to establish a naval station to protect their commercial interest in the region and to suppress piracy in the South China Sea. The British also believed the island could be the next Singapore. The island became a Crown Colony in 1848 with James Brooke appointed as the first governor and commander-in-chief, with William Napier as his lieutenant-governor. In 1849, the Eastern Archipelago Company became the first of several British companies to try to exploit Labuan coal deposits. The company was formed to exploit coal deposits on the island and adjacent coast of Borneo but soon became involved in a dispute with James Brooke. Not proving itself a great commercial or strategic asset, administration of Labuan was handed to the British North Borneo Company in 1890. In 1894, a submarine communications cable was built by the British to link the island's communications with North Borneo, Singapore and Hong Kong for the first time. By 30 October 1906, the British Government proposed to extend the boundaries of the Straits Settlements to include Labuan. The proposal took effect from 1 January 1907.

In World War II, Labuan was occupied by Japan from 3 January 1942 until June 1945 and garrisoned by units of the Japanese 37th Army, which controlled Northern Borneo. The island served as the administrative centre for the Japanese forces. During the occupation, the Japanese Government changed the island name to Maida Island ( [Maeda-shima]) on 9 December 1942 after Marquis Toshinari Maeda, as a remembrance to the first Japanese commander in northern Borneo. Maeda was killed in an air crash at Bintulu, Sarawak when en route to the island to open the airfield there. As the Allied counter-attack came closer, the Japanese also developed Labuan and Brunei Bay as a naval base.

The liberation of Borneo by the Allied forces began on 10 June 1945 when the Australian Army under the command of Australian Major General George Wootten launched an attack under the codename of Operation Oboe Six. Labuan became the main objective for the Allied forces to repossess. Soon, the 9th Division of the Australian Army launched the attack with support from airstrikes and sea bombardments until the capture of the Labuan airstrip. Most of the Labuan island area including the main town of Victoria was under the control of Allied forces within four days of the landing on 10 June. On 9 September 1945, the Japanese Lieutenant General Masao Baba officially surrendered at a place now known as Surrender Point near the Layang-layang beach which he had been brought to the 9th Division headquarters on the island to sign the surrender document in front of the Australian 9th Division Army Commander George Wootten.

The name of Labuan was later restored by the British and the island was administered under the British Military Administration together with the rest of the Straits Settlements. Labuan then on 15 July 1946 joined the North Borneo Crown Colony, which in turn became a part of the state of Sabah and Malaysia in 1963. In 1984, the Government of Sabah ceded Labuan to the federal government and later was admitted as a federal territory. It was declared an international offshore financial centre and free trade zone in 1990.

Geography

Over 70% of the island is still covered with vegetation. The main town area of Victoria is located in a position facing Brunei Bay.

Islands
 Labuan Island
 Daat Island
 Papan Island
 Burung Island
 Kuraman Island
 Big Rusukan Island (Pulau Rusukan Besar)
 Small Rusukan Island (Pulau Rusukan Kecil)

Climate
Labuan has a tropical rainforest climate with no dry season. The warm season lasts from 1 April to 13 June with an average daily high temperature above . The cold season lasts from 7 January to 17 February with an average daily high temperature below . The weather station for Labuan is located at Labuan Airport.

Thunderstorms are the most severe precipitation observed in Labuan during 60% of those days with precipitation. They are most likely around October, when they occur very frequently. Meanwhile, the relative humidity for Labuan typically ranges from 63% (mildly humid) to 96% (very humid) over the course of the year, rarely dropping below 53% and reaching as high as 100% (extremely humid).

Government
Labuan is one of the Malaysian federal government territories. The island is administered by the federal government through the Ministry of Federal Territories. Labuan Corporation is the municipal government for the island and is headed by a chairman who is responsible for the development and administration of the island. Labuan has one representative in each of the Lower and Upper Houses of Parliament. Typically, the current member of the parliament of Labuan will be appointed to become chairman of Labuan Corporation.

The island is represented in the lower house of parliament by MP Suhaili Abdul Rahman of PN and in the upper house by Senator Bashir Alias of UMNO.
Below is the list of administrators of Labuan Corporation from 2001 to the current date:

Administrative subdivision
The Federal Territory is administratively subdivided into the capital Bandar Victoria and 27 kampung (administrative villages), and which are ruled by appointed Ketua Kampung (headmen):

 Bukit Kalam
 Durian Tunjung
 Tanjung Aru
 Pohon Batu
 Batu Arang
 Patau-Patau 2
 Belukut
 Sungai Keling
 Sungai Bedaun / Sungai Sembilang
 Layang-Layangan
 Sungai Labu
 Pantai
 Gersik / Saguking / Jawa / Parit
 Sungai Buton
 Kilan / Kilan Pulau Akar
 Lajau
 Rancha-Rancha
 Nagalang / Kerupang
 Bebuloh
 Sungai Lada
 Lubok Temiang
 Sungai Bangat
 Sungai Miri / Pagar
 Patau-Patau 1
 Batu Manikar
 Bukit Kuda
 Ganggarak / Merinding

Security
Security is the responsibility of the federal government, with naval patrol vessels, a garrison, and an air detachment based on the island. The vigilance of the local Coast Guard and Customs and Excise contribute to the maintenance of Labuan's reputation and status as an international offshore financial centre and free trade zone.

Demographics

Population and religion

According to Malaysia's Department of Statistics, Labuan's population was 86,908 at the 2010 Census and 95,120 at the 2020 Census. The ethnic composition in 2010 in Labuan was: Brunei Malay and Kedayan (30,001), Kadazan-Dusun including/excluding Rungus (7,380), Bajau (6,300), Murut and Lun Bawang/Lundayeh (701), Chinese (10,014), Indians (641), other ethnic groups (19,727), and non-Malaysian citizens (12,144). The majority of Chinese people in Labuan are from the Hokkien dialect group (but has been since decreasing due to migration to the Peninsula as well as overseas); however, there are also many Hakkas, most of whom are migrants or descendants of migrants from mainland Sabah as well as local-born Hakkas, whom are settled for more than 2 to 3 generations in the island dating as long as the colonial period, in which they came as stopover migrants or traders before embarking to the mainland (even when it was still an only island offshore municipality within Sabah state jurisdiction from 1963 to 1984) as well as a negligible minority of Fuzhounese from neighbouring Sarawak, mostly working as government staff and those posted in the petroleum and gas offshore industries and to a lesser extent a large minority of Dayaks also from Sarawak who are resident here and their local-born descendants whom are mostly ethnically Iban with pockets of Bidayuh and Orang Ulu residents.

 Census the population of Labuan is 76.0% Muslim, 12.4% Christian, 9.0% Buddhist, 0.4% Hindu, 2.1% follower of other religions, and 0.1% non-religious.

Economy

The economy of Labuan thrives on its vast oil and gas resources and international investment and banking services. Labuan is very much an import-export oriented economy. Virtually all of its commodities including crude oil, methanol, HBI, gas, flour, animal feed, sea products, and ceramic tiles are exported either to Peninsular Malaysia or overseas. Raw materials, parts, and equipments for industrial uses well as consumer products are imported. In 2004, the total value of Labuan's external trade reached MYR11.8 billion from only MYR5.0 billion in 1995 for a net trade surplus of MYR5.1 billion. Among its major trade partners are India, Peninsular Malaysia, Sarawak, and South Korea. 65% of its exports are petroleum and gas-based products.

The Gross Domestic Product (GDP) of Labuan is estimated at MYR3.63 billion in 2012 with a growth rate of 5.8 percent. Labuan GDP per capita in 2012 is MYR39,682. The total employment for Labuan is around 39,800 in 2012. The main economic sectors in Labuan is service and manufacturing which contributed 94.6 percent to the island GDP. The service sector consisted mainly of Finance and Insurance and Real Estate and Business Services. Meanwhile, the manufacturing sector consists mainly of oil and gas industry and support.

The Labuan International Business and Financial Centre Labuan IBFC was created as Malaysia's only offshore financial hub in October 1990 and was operating under the name of Labuan International Offshore Financial Centre (IOFC). At the time it was established to strengthen the contribution of financial services to the Gross National Product (GNP) of Malaysia as well as to develop the island and its surrounding vicinity. The jurisdiction, supervised by the Labuan Offshore Financial Services Authority or LOFSA, offers benefits such as 3% tax on net audited results or a flat rate of Malaysian Ringgit (MYR) 20,000 to trading companies; low operational costs; liberal exchange controls; and a host of other advantages including readily available, experienced and professional service providers. In 2010 the notion "offshore" was excluded from all the statutes of Labuan due to world pressure on the tax havens and offshores.

Since its inception, the jurisdiction has expanded to become a base for more than 17,600 offshore companies and more than 300 licensed financial institutions including world leading banks. The IBFC also has over 370 registered foundations, 100 partnerships, and over 63 licensed trusts. Labuan IBFC is embarking on an aggressive growth strategy to become the premier international business and financial centre in the Asia Pacific region.

Labuan's business focus is on five core areas: offshore holding companies, captive insurance, Shariah-compliant Islamic Finance structures, public and private funds, and wealth management. Labuan IBFC's position is further enhanced by the launch of the Malaysian International Islamic Finance Centre initiative in August 2006.

Places of interest

There are several attractions and places of interest on Labuan. The Labuan War Cemetery contains various war graves and memorials to the fallen of World War II. This includes British, Australian, Indian, Sarawakian, Bruneian, North Bornean, and Empire troops, making it the largest war grave with 3,908 graves of fallen soldiers. A memorial service is held on Remembrance Day once every four years.

There is also a memorial celebrating the surrender of the Japanese to the Australian Forces in 1945. There are also remnants of Labuan's history as a Royal Navy coaling station, including the chimney, a well known local landmark. There is also a Labuan Maritime Museum.

Labuan is also the base for diving on four popular wreck dives: the Cement wreck, the American wreck, (the first USS Salute), the Australian wreck and the Blue Water wreck.

Labuan has many schools. However, it has only one international school, Labuan International School. Other places of interest include the Labuan International Sea Sport Complex. Newly proposed is the Marina Centre and Labuan Square project which were completed in 2010.

Labuan's own institution of higher education is Universiti Malaysia Sabah Labuan International Campus, a branch of Universiti Malaysia Sabah in Sepanggar Bay, Kota Kinabalu. Labuan also has a matriculation college, Kolej Matrikulasi Labuan, the only matriculation college in East Malaysia. Thus, all pre-university students from Sabah, Sarawak and Labuan will take their courses here.

Postage stamps and postal history

A post office was operating in Labuan by 1864, and used a circular date stamp as postmark. The postage stamps of India and Hong Kong were used on some mail, but they were probably carried there by individuals, instead of being on sale in Labuan. Mail was routed through Singapore. From 1867, Labuan officially used the postage stamps of the Straits Settlements but began issuing its own in May 1879.

Although initially the design for the first stamp issue was proposed to be depicting a clump of sago palms, for economic reasons, the queen heads design was finally adopted, having been used initially for postage stamps of Grenada. The first stamps of Labuan therefore depict the usual profile of Queen Victoria but are unusual for being inscribed in Malay-Arabic (Jawi) and Chinese scripts in addition to "LABUAN POSTAGE". Perennial shortages necessitated a variety of surcharges in between the several reprints and colour changes of the 1880s. The original stamps were engraved, but the last of the design, in April 1894, were done by lithography.

Beginning in May 1894, the stamps of North Borneo were overprinted "LABUAN". On 24 September 1896, the 50th anniversary of the cession was marked by overprinting "1846 / JUBILEE / 1896" on North Borneo stamps. Additional overprints appeared through the 1890s. In 1899 many types were surcharged with a value of 4 cents.

The last Labuan-only design came out in 1902, depicting a crown and inscribed "LABUAN COLONY". After incorporation into the Straits Settlements in 1906, Labuan ceased issuing its own stamps, although they remained valid for some time. Many of the remainder were cancelled-to-order for sale to collectors and are now worth only pennies; genuine franked/post used stamps are worth much more.

Federal Parliament Seats 
List of Labuan representatives in the Federal Parliament (Dewan Rakyat)

Notable residents
 Ayu Mansor - actor, radio announcer
 Hassan Sani, Malaysian and Sabah football player
 Kelvin Teo, young entrepreneur and season 1 winner of reality show Love Me Do
 Karen Kong, Hong Kong-based Malaysian pop singer
 Suresh Singh, right-hand bowler who plays for the Malaysian cricket national team
 Yussof Mahal, politician from Barisan National party and former Member of Parliament for Labuan

Notes

References

Further reading
 Labuan Story: Memoirs of a Small Island near the Coast of North Borneo (1958) Maxwell Hall Jesselton, North Borneo: Chung Nam.
 The history of Labuan Island (Victoria Island) (1996) Stephen R. Evans, Abdul Rahman Zainal and Rod Wong Khet Ngee. Singapore: Calendar Print
 Chai Foh Chin (2007) Early Picture Postcards of North Borneo and Labuan
 Stephen R. Evans, Abdul Rahman Zainal and Rod Wong Khet Ngee (Reprint 2007) The History of Labuan (Victoria Island)

External links

 Labuan – Travel information
 Labuan Corporation
 Labuan Tourism
 Labuan International Business and Financial Centre, Malaysia

 
Federal Territories in Malaysia
Islands of Malaysia
Islands of the South China Sea
History of North Borneo
British Borneo
History of Sabah
Philately of Malaysia
Maritime Southeast Asia